Constance Mary Towers (born May 20, 1933) is an American film, stage, and television actress, and singer. She gained prominence for her appearances in several mainstream 1950s films before transitioning to theater, starring in numerous Broadway productions through the 1970s. Her accolades include two Emmy Award nominations.

Beginning in 1965, Towers embarked on a career in theater, making her Broadway debut in the musical Anya, opposite Lillian Gish, followed by a 1966 production of Show Boat at Lincoln Center. Towers starred in four other Broadway productions throughout the 1970s, most notably as Anna in The King and I in 1977 and 1978. Her later career largely has been based in television, with roles as matriarch Clarissa McCandless on the daytime drama Capitol from 1982 to 1987, and the villainous Helena Cassadine on General Hospital, which she began portraying in 1997.

Early life
Towers was born May 20, 1933 in Whitefish, Montana, one of two daughters born to Ardath L. (née Reynolds) and Harry J. Towers, a pharmacist. Her mother, originally from Nebraska, was of Irish descent, while her father was an Ireland native from Dublin, who immigrated to the United States through Philadelphia. Towers' family relocated throughout western Montana in her early childhood, living in Whitefish, Missoula, and Kalispell, as well as in Moscow, Idaho.

In 1940, when Towers was in first grade, she was discovered by talent scouts visiting Montana in search of child actors for radio programs. Towers's family subsequently relocated to Seattle, Washington, and she began working as a child radio actress on Pacific Northwest programs over the following three years. According to her official website, Towers was offered a contract with Paramount Pictures at age 11, but the offer was declined by her parents. At age 12, she worked at a small local movie theater in her hometown of Whitefish.

In her adolescence, her family relocated to New York City after her father took a job there as an executive vice president for a pharmaceutical company. There she attended the Juilliard School, studying music, and American Academy of Dramatic Arts. She studied singing with well known voice teacher Beverley Peck Johnson.

Career

1955–1964: Early film work

While attending Juilliard, Towers was discovered by a film agent. "I was very lucky," Towers recalled. "An agent saw me and believed in me and we were walking down Fifth Avenue and the manager of the St. Regis Hotel asked if I could sing. My agent told him yes and he asked if I could open in three weeks. I learned a series of songs, put on a dress, sang to the critics, and got good reviews. That night a casting man from Columbia Pictures saw me and flew me to L.A. to meet with Harry Cohn, president of Columbia. They had me read with Jack Lemmon, then signed me to a contract."

Towers made her film debut in a supporting part in the film Bring Your Smile Along (1955), followed by a supporting part in the crime thriller Over-Exposed (1956). In 1958, she was cast in her first leading role as Hannah Hunter in John Ford's Civil War film The Horse Soldiers (1959) opposite John Wayne and William Holden. The following year, she appeared in Ford's follow-up film Sergeant Rutledge (1960), a racially themed crime Western.

In 1963, Towers was cast in a supporting role in Samuel Fuller's thriller Shock Corridor (1963), which tells the story of a journalist who commits himself to a psychiatric hospital to solve a murder. Her role as a stripper in the film was described by The New York Times as "hard, driving, and realistic." In preparation for the role, Towers spent time at exotic dance clubs in Los Angeles.

Fuller cast Towers again in a lead role in his following film The Naked Kiss (1964), another lurid and hard-edged thriller, in which she plays a crazed prostitute who attempts to assimilate in suburbia after having battered her pimp. Eugene Archer of The New York Times commented: "Patently absurd as the plot may be, Mr. Fuller has filmed it with flair, and he has drawn a richly amusing performance from Miss Towers. Between his stylish handling of sensational nonsense and Mr. Marton's turgid floundering around a serious theme, Mr. Fuller's wild little movie has a decided edge."

The same year, Towers appeared in the thriller Fate Is the Hunter, which chronicles the investigation of an airline crash. She also worked as a model for the Heart Fund Benefit at a fashion show held in Reno, Nevada. Between 1961 and 1965, she had five guest roles on the series Perry Mason; in her first two appearances, she played the murderer: Jonny Baker in "The Case of the Missing Melody" (1961) and Esther Metcalfe in "The Case of the Prankish Professor" (1963).

1965–1990: Theater career

After several film, television, and stage roles (including a West Coast tour of Guys and Dolls), Towers made her Broadway debut playing the title role in Anya, a short-lived 1965 musical.

Towers appeared as Julie in a 1966 production of Show Boat at Lincoln Center. She also starred in Carousel in 1966 and The Sound of Music in 1967, which she would reprise in 1970, 1971 and 1980 at the Jones Beach Theater in Long Island, New York.

She briefly played Anna Leonowens in 1968, and later she played opposite Yul Brynner in a long-running revival of The King and I on tour and then on Broadway (1976–1978). Clive Barnes praised Towers in the role, and theatre writer John Kenrick calls her performance on the 1977 cast album "great."

In 1995, she played the role of Phyllis in Stephen Sondheim's Follies.

From the mid-1960s until the 1990s, Towers' career was primarily focused on theater, though she did appear in films occasionally. She starred in the 1974 television film Once in Her Life, which earned her an Emmy Award nomination for Best Actress in a Special Program. She also appeared on television, playing Marian Hiller, the wife of Dr. Sanford Hiller in Love is a Many Splendored Thing (1971–72).

She had a starring role as noble widow Clarissa McCandless in Capitol (1982–87, the show's entire run), playing rival to the scheming matriarch Myrna Clegg (Carolyn Jones, Marla Adams, Marj Dusay) in trying to see her son succeed in politics and the long-term love of powerful Senator Mark Denning (Ed Nelson). A memorable storyline had her being shot by Mark's mentally ill wife Paula (Julie Adams) and later finding out that her husband Baxter (Ron Harper) was still alive. For this part, she received a Soap Opera Digest Nomination for Best Supporting Actress.

1991–present: Television, General Hospital

Towers had a supporting part in the film The Next Karate Kid (1994) and appeared on television as John Abbott's former secretary, Audrey North, on The Young and the Restless (1996). She later played Madame Julianna Deschanel on Sunset Beach (1997). In 1998, Towers had supporting parts in the horror film The Relic (1998), and the thriller A Perfect Murder (1998), playing the mother of Gwyneth Paltrow's character.

Towers' best-known soap part is as villainous Helena Cassadine on General Hospital. She began playing Helena in late 1997, until the character's death in 2015; Towers made additional onscreen guest appearances in 2016, 2017, 2019 and most recently February 2020. In October 2020, Towers briefly reprised the role of Helena in an offscreen cameo; Helena was heard via a phone call.

Towers guest-starred in the Star Trek: Deep Space Nine episode "The Forsaken" in 1993. She also appeared in Designing Women, Frasier, Baywatch, and The Fresh Prince of Bel-Air. Other television roles include State Trooper, Hawaii Five-O, The Rockford Files, L.A. Law, The 4400, and Cold Case.

In 2008, Towers starred in the Los Angeles revival of Arthur Allan Seidelman's production of Six Dance Lessons in Six Weeks; the play premiered at the Geffen Playhouse in 2001 with Uta Hagen and David Hyde Pierce in the two roles.

Personal life
Towers was first married to Eugene McGrath from 1959 until their divorce in 1966. In 1974, she married actor and former ambassador to Mexico John Gavin. She has two children from her first marriage. She also has two stepchildren from her marriage to Gavin. Gavin died on February 9, 2018, aged 86.

Towers serves as chairwoman of the board of directors of the  Blue Ribbon of the Los Angeles Music Center.

Filmography

Film

Television

Stage credits

References

Sources

External links

 
 
 
 Interview, May 17, 2017; accessed May 18, 2017.
 Interview with Constance Towers, October 21, 2019, Classic Film & TV Cafe.

1933 births
Living people
Actresses from Montana
Actresses from Seattle
American women singers
American film actresses
American musical theatre actresses
American people of Irish descent
American soap opera actresses
American television actresses
Juilliard School alumni
People from Missoula, Montana
People from Whitefish, Montana
Philanthropists from California
20th-century American actresses
21st-century American actresses